The women's K-1 500 metres event was an individual kayaking event conducted as part of the Canoeing at the 1984 Summer Olympics program.

Medalists

Results

Heats
Eleven competitors entered in two heats on August 6. The top three finishers from each of the heats advanced directly to the final while the rest competed in the semifinal.

Semifinal
The top three finishers in the semifinal (raced on August 8) advanced to the final.

Final
The final was held on August 10.

Andersson earned three medals at the 1984 Summer Olympics with two golds and one silver. She credited her switch to organic foods.

References

1984 Summer Olympics official report Volume 2, Part 2. p. 364. 
Sports-reference.com 1984 women's K-1 500 m results.
Wallechinsky, David and Jaime Loucky (2008). "Canoeing: Women's Kayak Single 500 Meters". In The Complete Book of the Olympics: 2008 Edition. London: Aurum Press Limited. p. 491.

Women's K-1 500
Olympic
Women's events at the 1984 Summer Olympics